The Youth Olympic Games (YOG) is an international multi-sport event organized by the International Olympic Committee. The games are held every four years in staggered summer and winter events consistent with the current Olympic Games format, though in reverse order with Winter Games held in leap years instead of Summer Games.

Current sports

Alpine skiing 
For the Youth Olympic Games, there are three venues that have been or will be used for alpine skiing.

Archery 
For the Youth Olympic Games, there are three venues that have been or will be used for archery.

Athletics 
For the Youth Olympic Games, there are four venues that have been or will be used for athletics.

Badminton 
For the Youth Olympic Games, there are three venues that have been or will be used for badminton.

Baseball5  
Baseball5 is added to 2026 Summer Youth Olympics for the first time.

Basketball 3x3 
For the Youth Olympic Games, there are three venues that have been or will be used for basketball 3x3.

Beach handball 
For the Youth Olympic Games, there are one venue that have been or will be used for beach handball.

Beach volleyball 
For the Youth Olympic Games, there are two venues that have been or will be used for beach volleyball.

Biathlon 
For the Youth Olympic Games, there are three venues that have been or will be used for biathlon .

Bobsleigh 
For the Youth Olympic Games, there are four venues that have been or will be used for bobsleigh.

Boxing 
For the Youth Olympic Games, there are three venues that have been or will be used for boxing.

Breaking 
For the Youth Olympic Games, there are one venue that have been or will be used for breaking.

Canoeing 
For the Youth Olympic Games, there are three venues that have been or will be used for canoeing.

Coastal rowing 
Coastal rowing is added to 2026 Summer Youth Olympics for the first time.

Cross-country skiing 
For the Youth Olympic Games, there are three venues that have been or will be used for cross-country skiing.

Curling 
For the Youth Olympic Games, there are three venues that have been or will be used for biathlon .

Cycling 
For the Youth Olympic Games, there are six venues that have been or will be used for cycling.

Diving 
For the Youth Olympic Games, there are four venues that have been or will be used for diving.

Equestrian 
For the Youth Olympic Games, there are three venues that have been or will be used for equestrian.

Fencing 
For the Youth Olympic Games, there are three venues that have been or will be used for fencing.

Figure skating 
For the Youth Olympic Games, there are three venues that have been or will be used for figure skating.

Freestyle skiing 
For the Youth Olympic Games, there are three venues that have been or will be used for freestyle skiing.

Futsal 
For the Youth Olympic Games, there are two venues that have been or will be used for futsal.

Golf 
For the Youth Olympic Games, there are two venues that have been or will be used for golf.

Gymnastics 
For the Youth Olympic Games, there are three venues that have been or will be used for gymnastics.

Hockey 5s 
For the Youth Olympic Games, there are two venues that have been or will be used for hockey 5s.

Ice hockey 
For the Youth Olympic Games, there are three venues that have been or will be used for ice hockey.

Judo 
For the Youth Olympic Games, there are three venues that have been or will be used for judo.

Karate 
For the Youth Olympic Games, there are one venue that have been or will be used for karate.

Luge 
For the Youth Olympic Games, there are three venues that have been or will be used for luge.

Modern pentathlon 
For the Youth Olympic Games, there are nine venues that have been or will be used for modern pentathlon.

Nordic combined 
For the Youth Olympic Games, there are three venues that have been or will be used for nordic combined.

Rugby sevens 
For the Youth Olympic Games, there are two venues that have been or will be used for rugby sevens.

Sailing 
For the Youth Olympic Games, there are four venues that have been or will be used for sailing.

Shooting 
For the Youth Olympic Games, there are four venues that have been or will be used for shooting.

Short track speed skating 
For the Youth Olympic Games, there are three venues that have been or will be used for short track speed skating.

Skateboarding 
For the Youth Olympic Games, there are one venue that have been used for skateboarding.

Skeleton 
For the Youth Olympic Games, there are three venues that have been or will be used for skeleton.

Ski jumping 
For the Youth Olympic Games, there are three venues that have been or will be used for ski jumping.

Ski mountaineering

Snowboarding 
For the Youth Olympic Games, there are three venues that have been or will be used for snowboarding.

Speed skating 
For the Youth Olympic Games, there are three venues that have been or will be used for speed skating.

Sport climbing 
For the Youth Olympic Games, there are two venues that have been or will be used for sport climbing.

Surfing 
Surfing is added to 2026 Summer Youth Olympics for the first time.

Swimming 
For the Youth Olympic Games, there are three venues that have been or will be used for swimming.

Table tennis 
For the Youth Olympic Games, there are three venues that have been or will be used for table tennis.

Taekwondo 
For the Youth Olympic Games, there are three venues that have been or will be used for taekwondo.

Tennis 
For the Youth Olympic Games, there are three venues that have been or will be used for tennis.

Triathlon 
For the Youth Olympic Games, there are three venues that have been or will be used for triathlon.

Weightlifting 
For the Youth Olympic Games, there are three venues that have been or will be used for weightlifting.

Wrestling 
For the Youth Olympic Games, there are three venues that have been or will be used for wrestling.

Wushu 
For the Youth Olympic Games, there are one venue that have been used for wushu.

Discontinued sports

Field hockey 
For the Youth Olympic Games, there are one venue that have been used for field hockey.

Football 
For the Youth Olympic Games, there are three venues that have been used for football.

Handball 
For the Youth Olympic Games, there are two venues that have been used for handball.

Roller speed skating  
For the Youth Olympic Games, there are two venues that have been used for roller speed skating.

Rowing 
For the Youth Olympic Games, there are three venues that have been used for rowing.

Volleyball 
For the Youth Olympic Games, there are one venue that have been used for volleyball.

Demonstration sports

Ekarting 
For the Youth Olympic Games, there are one venue that have been used for ekarting.

Polo 
For the Youth Olympic Games, there are one venue that have been used for polo.

Squash 
For the Youth Olympic Games, there are one venue that have been used for squash.

References 

V

Venues